Zabawa  (translation: Fun) is a village in the administrative district of Gmina Wieliczka, within Wieliczka County, Lesser Poland Voivodeship, in southern Poland.

The village has a population of 812.

References

Zabawa